Jai Narayan Poonia (1934 – 7 November 2021) was a Cabinet Minister and leader of Rajasthan in India. He served as Minister of Public Works. He was born in village Lakhlan Choti of district Churu in Rajasthan in the family of Choudhary Jagmal Poonia clan Hindu Jat. He married Manbhari Devi.

Political career
Poonia entered elections from the Sadulpur Constituency in Rajasthan in 1977 as Janata Party candidate and became PWD Minister. In 1985 he became MLA from Tara Nagar. He was the runner-up in 2003 and 1998 polls. He was a member of the Indian National Lok Dal party (INLD). In the 1998 polls, he secured almost 45% votes for this seat. His popularity declined and in 2003, he secured only 33%. In both the elections he was defeated by Indian National Congress candidates.

In western terms, he can be roughly categorized as a populist agrarian leader who is ready to adopt a market economy for the benefit of the "kissan" or peasant.

1977-80: Member of Rajasthan Legislative Assembly (MLA) Sadulpur Churu Vidhan Sabha for the Janata Party.

1978-80: Cabinet Minister in Rajasthan. He oversaw departments including Public Welfare Department(PWD), Disaster Management and Flood management.

1980-89: State Vice President of Janata Party in Rajasthan.

1985-90: Member of Rajasthan Legislative Assembly (MLA) Taranagar Churu Vidhan Sabha for the Janata Party.

1990-98: State Vice President of Janata Dal in Rajasthan.

2003-2008: State President of Indian National Lok Dal in Rajasthan.

2013- Won the state assembly election from Taranagar constituency contesting on BJP ticket by 11,136 votes

Education
Poonia graduated from Government High School Sangria with First Division. He completed law school and started his career as an advocate in Rajgarh district court.

References

1934 births
2021 deaths
State cabinet ministers of Rajasthan
Rajasthani people
People from Churu district
Janata Party politicians
Janata Dal politicians
Indian National Lok Dal politicians
Bharatiya Janata Party politicians from Rajasthan